Rabbi Yitzhak Cohen (born 2 October 1951) is an Israeli politician who served as a member of the Knesset for Shas in two spells between 1996 to 2020. He also held several ministerial portfolios.

Biography
Born in Ashkelon, Cohen served on the city's council, and was its former deputy mayor.

He served as Secretary-General of Shas' educational institution (El HaMa'ayan). He was first elected to Knesset in 1996. In his time in Knesset, he has served on the Finance Committee, Labor and Welfare Committee, Committee on Foreign Workers, Foreign Affairs & Defense Committee, Joint Committee for the Defense Budget, Special Committee for Discussion of the Security Service Law Substitute Member, Constitution, Law and Justice Committee, and the House Committee. He has also been a member of the Knesset Forum on the Middle East lobby, and is currently a member of the Lobby for Ethiopian Immigrants.

He became the Minister of Religious Affairs in July 1999, and resigned a year later. He served as the Deputy Minister of Finance from 2001 to 2003. In 2006, he was appointed the Minister without Portfolio, and is in charge of religious councils, a role converted to Religious Services Minister in January 2008.

In 2007, he criticized the US report that Iran had stopped its nuclear program in 2003. He said the report was "ordered by someone who wants dialogue with Tehran". He compared the event to when the US got intelligence in World War Two that said there were trains going to concentration camps, and they said they were being used for industrial purposes. In 2009, in an interview with the Spiegel, Cohen threatened to suspend relations with the Vatican, following the lifting of the excommunication of controversial bishop Richard Williamson.

He retained his seat in the 2009 elections, having been placed third on the Shas list. He lost his cabinet portfolio, instead becoming Deputy Finance Minister. He was re-elected again in 2013, but Shas were excluded from the government. After being re-elected for a sixth time in 2015, he regained the post of Deputy Minister of Finance in the new government. He gave up his Knesset seat in February 2018 under the Norwegian Law, and was replaced by Danny Saida. In January 2020 he was nominated as the Minister of Construction and Housing, but he withdrew his nomination after it was put on hold. After being re-elected in the March 2020 elections, he was appointed  Ministry of Construction and Minister in the Finance Ministry in October 2020. In November 2020, he resigned from his ministerial positions. On 1 February 2021 Cohen announced he was retiring from politics and would not contest the 2021 Knesset elections.

Personal life
Cohen resides in Ashkelon, and is married, with ten children. He was educated at a Talmudic College. He can speak Hebrew, English, and Arabic.

References

External links

1951 births
Living people
Deputy mayors of places in Israel
Deputy ministers of Israel
Government ministers of Israel
Ministers of Religious affairs of Israel
Israeli Orthodox Jews
Israeli people of Moroccan-Jewish descent
Members of the 14th Knesset (1996–1999)
Members of the 15th Knesset (1999–2003)
Members of the 16th Knesset (2003–2006)
Members of the 17th Knesset (2006–2009)
Members of the 18th Knesset (2009–2013)
Members of the 19th Knesset (2013–2015)
Members of the 20th Knesset (2015–2019)
Members of the 21st Knesset (2019)
Members of the 22nd Knesset (2019–2020)
Members of the 23rd Knesset (2020–2021)
People from Ashkelon
Shas politicians